The Pharaonist movement, or Pharaonism, is an ideology that rose to prominence in Egypt in the 1920s and 1930s. It looked to Egypt's pre-Islamic past and argued that Egypt was part of a larger Mediterranean civilization. This ideology stressed the role of the Nile River and the Mediterranean Sea. Pharaonism's most notable advocate was Taha Hussein.

Egyptian identity
Egyptian identity since the Iron Age Egyptian Empire evolved for the longest period under the influence of native Egyptian culture, religion and identity (see Ancient Egypt). The Egyptians came subsequently under the influence of brief successions of several foreign rulers. Under these foreign rulers, the Egyptians accommodated three new religions, Christianity, Judaism, and Islam, and produced a new language, Egyptian Arabic. By the 4th century, the majority of the Egyptians had converted to Christianity and in 535 the Roman Emperor Justinian ordered the Temple of Isis at Philae closed, which marked the formal end of the ancient religion of Egypt.

During the Middle Ages, the monuments of the ancient Egyptian civilization were sometimes destroyed as remnants of a time of jahiliyyah ("barbarous ignorance"). The majority of the destruction of the ruins occurred in the 13th and 14th centuries, a time of floods, famines and plagues in Egypt, leading some people to believe that Allah was punishing the Egyptians for the continued existence of these relics of a time of jahiliyyah. The most notable acts of destruction in the Middle Ages were the tearing down of a statue of the goddess Isis in 1311 in Fustat and the destruction of a temple in Memphis in 1350, which inspired much relief when it was discovered the "evil eye" (the eye of Horus) on the temple's walls did not cause the deaths of those destroying the temple as feared.

The Koran singled out the Pharaoh whose story is related in the Book of Exodus as an especially vicious tyrant opposed to Allah, and in general the Pharaohs are portrayed in Islamic tradition as depraved despots reveling in jahiliyyah. Several Muslim leaders such as the Caliph Yazid III ordered the destruction of all the pharaonic monuments. However, there is considerable evidence of popular local pride in monuments such as the Giza Pyramids and the Sphinx, so much that these monuments were never destroyed out of the fear of causing riots. The monuments of Pharaonic Egypt were generally seen as possessing magical powers and were viewed as objects of respect by ordinary Egyptians, despite the fact that the Koran execrates ancient Egypt as an especially reprehensible period of jahiliyyah. As late as 1378, it was reported that nominally Muslim peasants would go burn incense at night in front of the Sphinx while uttering prayers which were said to empower the Sphinx to speak, which led a Sufi holy man to attack the Sphinx. Local legends claimed the attack on the Sphinx led to a massive sand storm at Giza, which only ended with the holy man's lynching.

In Egypt, the popular belief that the Pyramids and the Sphinx together with the other ruins of ancient Egypt had magical powers did much to ensure their survival with one 13th century Muslim writer, Jamal al-Din al-Idrisi, warning that to destroy the Pyramids would unleash dark supernatural forces that would cause such carnage that horses would wade in human blood, leading him to the conclusion that the Pyramids were best left alone. Such beliefs about the magical powers said to be invested in the ruins of ancient Egypt testified to a certain popular pride in and reverence for the ancient past of Egypt. In the same way, Egyptians in the Middle Ages invented a story that the Pharaoh mentioned in the Book of Exodus and in the Koran was not an Egyptian, but rather an Iranian, in an attempt to salvage pride in the ancient past despite the way the Koran condemns it. To prevent the destruction of the ruins, medieval Egyptians usually "Islamized" the ruins by inventing stories associating them with the companions of the Islamic prophet Muhammad or local Sufi saints, thereby turning them into quasi-Islamic sites that could not be destroyed.

Because knowledge of the hieroglyphs was lost from the 6th century until 1822 when Jean-François Champollion deciphered the Rosetta Stone, the memory of ancient Egypt was that of an impressive civilization which built various monuments whose precise meaning had been long since been lost, limiting the extent of popular identification with it. Mohammad Ali the Great, the Albanian tobacco merchant turned Ottoman vali (governor) of Egypt and who ruled the country with an iron hand from 1805 until his death in 1849, had no interest in the ruins of ancient Egypt except as a source of gifts for foreign leaders. Likewise, Mohammad Ali had a permissive attitude towards Europeans taking ancient Egyptian relics with them, allowing much plundering of various sites such as by the Italian Giovanni Battista Belzoni while a diplomatic posting in Cairo was highly sought after owing to opportunities for looting. One of Mohammad Ali's officials, Rifa'a al-Tahtawi, persuaded him in 1836 to embark on preserving Egypt's heritage by ending the plundering of sites in Egypt and to create a museum to display Egypt's treasures instead of letting them be taken to Europe. Tahtawi later published a history of ancient Egypt in 1868, which took advantage of the discoveries of archaeologists and the deciphering of the hieroglyphs, which marked the first time that the heritage of ancient Egypt was used as a symbol of national pride in modern Egypt.

Nationalism
Questions of identity came to the fore in the 20th century as Egyptians sought to end the British occupation of Egypt, leading to the rise of ethno-territorial secular Egyptian nationalism (also known as "Pharaonism"). Pharaonism became the dominant mode of expression of Egyptian anti-colonial activists of the pre- and inter-war periods, according to modern historian and University of Colorado professor James P. Jankowski;

Pharaonism celebrated Egypt as a distinct geographic and political unit whose origins went back to the unification of Upper and Lower Egypt in about 3100 BC, and which presented Egypt as more closely linked to Europe rather than to the Middle East. The focus on the ancient Egyptian past was used as a symbol of Egyptian distinctiveness, which was used to down-play Arab and Islamic identities, and was intended to brand Egypt as a European rather than a Near Eastern nation. Pharaonism first appeared in the early 20th century in the writings of Mustafa Kamil Pasha who called Egypt the world's first state and Ahmed Lutfi el-Sayed who wrote about a "pharaonic core" surviving in modern Egypt.

In 1931, following a visit to Egypt, Syrian Arab nationalist Sati' al-Husri remarked that:
 The later 1930s would become a formative period for Arab nationalism in Egypt, in large part due to efforts by Syrian/Palestinian/Lebanese intellectuals. Nevertheless, a year after the establishment of the League of Arab States in 1945, to be headquartered in Cairo, Oxford University historian H. S. Deighton was still writing:

One of the most prominent Egyptian nationalists and anti-Arabists was Egypt's most notable writer of the 20th century, Taha Hussein. He expressed his disagreement with Arab unity and his beliefs in Egyptian nationalism on multiple occasions. In one of his most well known articles, written in 1933 in the magazine Kawkab el Sharq, he wrote saying:

It has been argued that until the 1940s, Egypt was more in favour of territorial, Egyptian nationalism and distant from the pan-Arab ideology. Egyptians generally did not identify themselves as Arabs, and it is revealing that when the Egyptian nationalist leader Saad Zaghlul met the Arab delegates at Versailles in 1918, he insisted that their struggles for statehood were not connected, claiming that the problem of Egypt was an Egyptian problem and not an Arab one.

In February 1924 Zaghloul, now prime minister of Egypt, had all of the treasures found in the tomb of King Tutankhamun seized from the British archaeological team led by Howard Carter under the grounds that the treasures belonged to Egypt and to prevent Carter from taking them to Britain as he wanted. Zaghloul justified the seizure under the grounds that "it is the duty of the government to defend the rights and dignity of the nation". On 6 March 1924, Zaghlul formally opened the tomb of King Tutankhamun to the Egyptian public in an elaborate ceremony held at night with the sky lit up by floodlights, which reportedly attracted the largest crowd ever seen in Luxor. The opening of Tutankhamun tomb was turned into a nationalist demonstration when the British High Commissioner, Field Marshal Allenby arrived, and was loudly booed by the crowd, who started to demand immediate British evacuation of Egypt. The long dead Tutankhamun was turned by the Wafd Party into a symbol of Egyptian nationalism, which was why Carter's plans to take the treasures from his tomb aroused such opposition in Egypt. However, the case of Tutankhamun's treasures were merely an opportunistic move by Zaghlul at asserting Egyptian independence, which had only been gained in February 1922, against Carter and his team, who were viewed as acting arrogantly towards the Egyptians.

Ahmed Hussein who founded the nationalistic and fascistic Young Egypt Society in 1933 stated that he became interested in Egyptian nationalism after a scouting trip through the Valley of the Kings in 1928, which inspired him with the belief that if Egypt was great once, then it could be great again. The Young Egypt Society glorified the ancient Egyptian past, which was regularly mentioned in party rallies, and in reference to Egypt's Turco-Circassian aristocracy demanded that Egypt have "a leader of action, who is not of Turkish or Circassian blood, but of Pharanoic blood". Initially, the Young Egypt Society had very particularist interpretation of Egyptian nationalism, which emphasized that Egypt was not just another Muslim and/or Arab nation, but rather having a very distinctive identity owing to the heritage of ancient Egypt. The Young Egypt Society, which was closely modeled along the lines of the fascist movements of Italy and Germany, called for a British withdrawal from Egypt, the union of Egypt and the Sudan, and for Egypt under the banner of Arab nationalism to create an empire stretching from the Atlantic to the Indian oceans. The invocation of the glories of ancient Egypt by the Young Egypt Society was used to explain why the Egyptians were to dominate the proposed pan-Arab state. However, Hussein discovered that Pharaonism appealed only to middle class Egyptians, and limited his party's appeal to the Egyptian masses. Starting in 1940, the Young Egypt Society abandoned Pharaonism and sought to reinvent itself as an Islamic fundamentalist party.

"Pharaonism" was condemned by Hassan al-Banna, the founder and Supreme Guide of the fundamentalist Muslim Brotherhood, as glorifying a period of jahiliyyah ("barbarous ignorance"), which is the Islamic term for the pre-Islamic past. In a 1937 article, Banna attacked Pharaonism for glorifying the "pagan reactionary Pharaohs" like Akhenaten, Ramesses the Great and Tutankhamun instead of Muhammad and his companions and for seeking to "annihilate" Egypt's Muslim identity. Banna insisted that Egypt could only be part of the wider Islamic ummah ("community") and that any effort to mark Egyptian distinctiveness from the rest of Islamic world was going against the will of Allah.

Arab identity

However, Egypt under King Farouk was a founding member of the Arab League in 1945, and the first Arab state to declare war in support of the Palestinians in the Palestine War of 1948. This Arab nationalist sentiment increased exponentially after the Egyptian Revolution of 1952. The primary leaders of the Revolution, Muhammad Naguib, and Gamal Abdel Nasser, were staunch Arab nationalists who stressed that pride in Egypt's individual indigenous identity was entirely consistent with pride in an overarching Arab cultural identity. It was during Naguib's tenure as leader that Egypt adopted the Arab Liberation Flag to symbolise the country's links to the rest of the Arab World.

For a while Egypt and Syria formed the United Arab Republic. When the union was dissolved, Egypt continued to be known as the UAR until 1971, when Egypt adopted the current official name, the Arab Republic of Egypt. The Egyptians' attachment to Arabism, however, was particularly questioned after the 1967 Six-Day War. Thousands of Egyptians had lost their lives and the country became disillusioned with Pan-Arab politics. Nasser's successor Anwar Al Sadat, both through public policy and his peace initiative with Israel, revived an uncontested Egyptian orientation, unequivocally asserting that only Egypt and Egyptians were his responsibility. The terms "Arab," "Arabism," and "Arab unity," save for the new official name, became conspicuously absent. (See also Liberal age and Republic sections.) Sadat only engaged in Pharaonism for international consumption, as when he arranged for the mummy of King Ramses the Great to go to Paris for restoration work in 1974; he insisted the French provide an honor guard at Charles de Gaulle airport to fire a 21 gun salute as befitting a head of state when the coffin containing King Ramses' corpse touched French soil. Domestically, Pharaonism was discouraged under Sadat, who closed the mummy room in the Egyptian Museum for offending Muslim sensibilities, though in private Sadat was said to remark that "Egyptian kings are not be made a spectacle of" suggesting a degree of respect for the ancient past. Pharaonism largely exists in Egypt today for the tourist industry, and most Egyptians do not deeply identify with ancient Egypt.

Although the overwhelming majority of Egyptians today continue to self-identify as Arabs in a linguistic sense, a growing minority reject this, pointing to the failures of Arab and pan-Arab nationalist policies, and even publicly voicing objection to the present official name of the country.

In late 2007, el-Masri el-Yom daily newspaper conducted an interview at a bus stop in the working-class district of Imbaba to ask citizens what Arab nationalism (el-qawmeyya el-'arabeyya) represented for them. One Egyptian Muslim youth responded, "Arab nationalism means that the Egyptian Foreign Minister in Jerusalem gets humiliated by the Palestinians, that Arab leaders dance upon hearing of Sadat's death, that Egyptians get humiliated in Eastern Arabia, and of course that Arab countries get to fight Israel until the last Egyptian soldier." Another felt that, "Arab countries hate Egyptians", and that unity with Israel may even be more of a possibility than Arab nationalism, because he believes that Israelis would at least respect Egyptians.

Some contemporary prominent Egyptians who oppose Arab nationalism or the idea that Egyptians are Arabs include Secretary General of the Supreme Council of Antiquities Zahi Hawass, popular writer Osama Anwar Okasha, Egyptian-born Harvard University Professor Leila Ahmed, Member of Parliament Suzie Greiss, in addition to different local groups and intellectuals. This understanding is also expressed in other contexts, such as Neil DeRosa's novel Joseph's Seed in his depiction of an Egyptian character "who declares that Egyptians are not Arabs and never will be."

Critics of Arab nationalism
Egyptian critics of Arab nationalism contend that it has worked to erode and/or relegate native Egyptian identity by superimposing only one aspect of Egypt's culture. These views and sources for collective identification in the Egyptian state are captured in the words of a linguistic anthropologist who conducted fieldwork in Cairo:

Copts

Many Coptic intellectuals hold to a version of Pharaonism which states that Coptic culture is largely derived from pre-Christian, Ancient Egyptian culture. It gives the Copts a claim to a deep heritage in Egyptian history and culture. However, some Western scholars today see Pharaonism as a late development, arguing that it was shaped primarily by Orientalism, and they doubt its validity.

The problems of Pharaonism as an integrating ideology
The Canadian archaeologist Michael Wood argued that one of the principal problems of Pharaonism as an integrating ideology for the population is that it glorifies a period in time too remote for most Egyptians, and moreover, one that lacks visible signs of continuity for the Arabic speaking Muslim majority, such as a common language, culture, or alphabet. Wood noted that the popular belief that ancient Egypt was a "slave state" has been questioned by archaeologists and historians, but this popular image held in both the Islamic and the Western nations of a "slave state" makes identification with this period problematic. The story told in the Book of Exodus of an unnamed Pharaoh whose cruelty led him to enslave the Israelites and whose hubris caused his death when he unwisely attempted to follow Moses across the parting of the Red Sea has led to the Pharaohs being portrayed across the ages as a symbol of tyranny. When President Sadat was assassinated on 6 October 1981 reviewing a military parade in Cairo, his Muslim fundamentalist assassins were heard to shout: "We have killed the Pharaoh!" In Arabic, the verb tafarana, meaning to act tyrannically, literally translates as "acting Pharaohically".

Wood wrote that even the surviving ruins of ancient Egypt, consisting mostly of "tombs, palaces and temples, the relics of a death-obsessed, aristocratic, pagan society," seem to confirm the popular image of a "slave state," while the "more sophisticated models of Egyptian history, developed mainly by foreign scholars, remain ignored". The ruins of ancient Egypt, with their pompous and grandiose bragging about the greatness of the god-kings who had them built, give the impression of a society slavishly devoted to serving the kings who proclaimed themselves to be living gods. Wood wrote that it is not certain if this was indeed the case, as Egyptologists know very little about the feelings and thoughts of ordinary people in ancient Egypt, but it is clear that ancient Egypt was a "highly stratified society", which makes it difficult for people today to identify with a society whose values were so different from the present.

One of the principal reasons why Pharaonism went into decline starting in the 1940s was because the Koran condemns ancient Egypt so strongly, making it very difficult for Egyptian Muslims to use the symbols of ancient Egypt without causing accusations of abandoning their faith Wood wrote that a principal difference between Egypt and Mexico is that Mexicans can and do incorporate elements from Mesoamerican civilizations like the Olmecs, the Maya, and the Mexica (Aztecs), which are seen as part of a national continuity interrupted by the Spanish conquest of 1519–1521 and resumed with independence in 1821, whereas it is impossible for Egyptians to use pharaonic symbols "without being left open to the charges that such symbols were non-Islamic or anti-Islamic". Wood wrote: "Islam and the Egypt of the Pharaohs could be reconciled only with great difficulty; in the end they could not but compete...Egyptian nationalists who wished to look for their ancient history for inspiration would have to start from scratch and would have to distance themselves from an Islamic identity with which the Pharaonic past could not really coexist with".

Another problem was posed by the way in which almost all of the archaeological work  on ancient Egypt in the 19th century and the first half of the 20th century was done by foreign archaeologists who discouraged Egyptians from studying the period. Western archaeologists tended to see the study of ancient Egypt as having nothing to do with modern Egypt; even the very term Egyptology refers to the study of pre-Roman Egypt, not modern Egypt. In the 19th century, various racial theories were devised to claim that the Egyptians were not the descendants of the ancient Egyptians, or alternatively, the history of ancient Egypt was a cycle of renewal caused by the conquests of racially superior invaders and decline caused by miscegenation with the racially inferior native population. The purpose of such theories was to assert the West was the "true heirs" of ancient Egypt, whose people were viewed as "honorary Westerners" with no connection to modern Egyptians. The effects of such efforts was to persuade many Egyptians that the pharaonic past was indeed not part of their heritage.

Moreover, since the Coptic language is descended from the ancient Egyptian language, starting in the 19th century a number of Copts have identified with Pharaonism as a way of emphasizing that they are "purer" Egyptians than the Muslim majority. For the purpose of building a national identity, an ideology that can be used to privilege a minority as being more authentic Egyptian than the majority presents problems, and generally, efforts to build an Egyptian national identity that embraces both Muslims and Copts have turned to the more recent periods of the past . Wood wrote that for the purposes of building national pride, "the Pharaonic past, for the Egyptian nationalist, was simply the wrong past."

See also
Copts
Egyptian Revolution of 1919
Ethnic groups in Egypt
Ethnic identity
National myth
Phoenicianism
Assyrian continuity
Kemetism
Shu'ubiyya

References

Citations

Bibliography

 Wood, Michael "The Use of the Pharaonic Past in Modern Egyptian Nationalism" p. 179–196 from The Journal of the American Research Center in Egypt, Volume 35, 1998

 
20th century in Egypt